Eilsleben is a municipality in the Börde district in Saxony-Anhalt, Germany. In January 2010 it absorbed the former municipality Wormsdorf and in September 2010 the former municipalities Drackenstedt, Druxberge and Ovelgünne.

References

Börde (district)